Kepler is both a surname and a masculine given name. Notable people with the name include:

Surname:
Angela Kepler (born 1943), New Zealand-born American writer
Johannes Kepler (1571–1630), German mathematician, astronomer and astrologer
Katharina Kepler (1546–1622), German witch
Lars Kepler, the pen name for writers Alexander Ahndoril and Alexandra Coelho Ahndoril
Max Kepler (born 1993), German baseball player
Shell Kepler (1958–2008), American actress

Given name:
Kepler Bradley (born 1985), Australian rules footballer
Kepler Engelbrecht, German software developer
Kepler Orellana (born 1977), Venezuelan tennis player
Kepler Wessels (born 1957), South African cricketer
Képler Laveran Lima Ferreira (born 1983), Brazilian-born Portuguese footballer (a.k.a. Pepe)

See also
Keplar B. Johnson (1896–1972), American architect

Masculine given names
German masculine given names
German-language surnames
Occupational surnames